Nagano 3rd district (長野県第3区, Nagano-ken dai-sanku or 長野3区, Nagano sanku) is a single-member constituency of the House of Representatives, the lower house of the national Diet of Japan. It is located in central and eastern part of  Nagano Prefecture and consists of Ueda City, Komoro City, Chikuma City, Saku City, Tōmi City, Minamisaku District, Kitasaku District, Chiisagata District and Hanishina District. As of December 2020, 400,529 eligible voters were registered in the district.

Yousei Ide, a Liberal Democrat, has represented this district since December 2014.

List of members representing the district

Election results

2021

2017

2014

2012

2009

2005

2003

2000

1996

References 

Nagano Prefecture
Districts of the House of Representatives (Japan)